Triethylamine is the chemical compound with the formula N(CH2CH3)3, commonly abbreviated Et3N. It is also abbreviated TEA, yet this abbreviation must be used carefully to avoid confusion with triethanolamine or tetraethylammonium, for which TEA is also a common abbreviation. It is a colourless volatile liquid with a strong fishy odor reminiscent of ammonia. Like diisopropylethylamine (Hünig's base), triethylamine is commonly employed in organic synthesis, usually as a base.

Synthesis and properties
Triethylamine is prepared by the alkylation of ammonia with ethanol:
NH3 + 3 C2H5OH → N(C2H5)3 + 3 H2O

The pKa of protonated triethylamine is 10.75, and it can be used to prepare buffer solutions at that pH. The hydrochloride salt, triethylamine hydrochloride (triethylammonium chloride), is a colorless, odorless, and hygroscopic powder, which decomposes when heated to 261 °C.

Triethylamine is soluble in water to the extent of 112.4 g/L at 20 °C. It is also miscible in common organic solvents, such as acetone, ethanol, and diethyl ether.

Laboratory samples of triethylamine can be purified by distilling from calcium hydride.

In alkane solvents triethylamine is a Lewis base that forms adducts with a variety of Lewis acids, such as I2 and phenols. Owing to its steric bulk, it forms complexes with transition metals reluctantly.

Applications
Triethylamine is commonly employed in organic synthesis as a base. For example, it is commonly used as a base during the preparation of esters and amides from acyl chlorides. Such reactions lead to the production of hydrogen chloride which combines with triethylamine to form the salt triethylamine hydrochloride, commonly called triethylammonium chloride. Hydrogen chloride may then evaporate from the reaction mixture, which drives the reaction. (R, R' = alkyl, aryl):
R2NH  +  R'C(O)Cl  +  Et3N  →  R'C(O)NR2  +  Et3NH+Cl−

Like other tertiary amines, it catalyzes the formation of urethane foams and epoxy resins.  It is also useful in dehydrohalogenation reactions and Swern oxidations.

Triethylamine is readily alkylated to give the corresponding quaternary ammonium salt:
RI + Et3N → Et3NR+I−

Triethylamine is mainly used in the production of quaternary ammonium compounds for textile auxiliaries and quaternary ammonium salts of dyes. It is also a catalyst and acid neutralizer for condensation reactions and is useful as an intermediate for manufacturing medicines, pesticides and other chemicals.

Triethylamine salts, like any other tertiary ammonium salts, are used as an ion-interaction reagent in ion interaction chromatography, due to their amphiphilic properties. Unlike quaternary ammonium salts, tertiary ammonium salts are much more volatile, therefore mass spectrometry can be used while performing analysis.

Niche uses
Triethylamine is used to give salts of various carboxylic acid-containing pesticides, e.g. Triclopyr and 2,4-dichlorophenoxyacetic acid

Triethylamine is the active ingredient in FlyNap, a product for anesthetizing Drosophila melanogaster. Triethylamine is used in mosquito and vector control labs to anesthetize mosquitoes. This is done to preserve any viral material that might be present during species identification.

The bicarbonate salt of triethylamine (often abbreviated TEAB, triethylammonium bicarbonate) is useful in reverse phase chromatography, often in a gradient to purify nucleotides and other biomolecules.

Triethylamine was found during the early 1940s to be hypergolic in combination with nitric acid, and was considered a possible propellant for early hypergolic rocket engines.
The Soviet "Scud" Missile used TG-02 ("Tonka-250"), a mixture of 50% xylidine and 50% triethlyamine as a starting fluid to ignite its rocket engine.

Natural occurrence
Hawthorn flowers have a heavy, complicated scent, the distinctive part of which is triethylamine, which is also one of the first chemicals produced by a dead human body when it begins to decay. Due to the scent , it is considered unlucky to bring hawthorn into a house. Gangrene and semen are also said to possess a similar odour.

References

External links
 US EPA - Air Toxics Website
 CDC - NIOSH Pocket Guide to Chemical Hazards

Alkylamines
Tertiary amines